Dayal Public School is a CBSE affiliated school in  Nawada in India.

Founded by Sri Tulsi Dayal in 2008,the school is run under the Dost . MP Sinha is the principal and Smt. Shilpee Sinha is the secretary of school

References

 https://www.jagran.com/bihar/nawada-science-exibition-in-nawada-13128676.html
 https://www.jagran.com/bihar/nawada-cbse-result-14089124.html
 https://www.jagran.com/bihar/nawada-9513346.html

Schools in Bihar
Nawada district
2008 establishments in Bihar
Educational institutions established in 2008